Euspira obtusa is a species of predatory sea snail, a marine gastropod mollusk in the family Naticidae, the moon snails.

Description
The length of the shell attains 10.2 mm.

Distribution
This species occurs in European waters (the South Shetland-Faeroe Ridge), in the Atlantic Ocean off Galicia, Spain and the Cape Verdes and West Africa.

References

 Gofas, S.; Le Renard, J.; Bouchet, P. (2001). Mollusca, in: Costello, M.J. et al. (Ed.) (2001). European register of marine species: a check-list of the marine species in Europe and a bibliography of guides to their identification. Collection Patrimoines Naturels, 50: pp. 180–213
 Rolán E., 2005. Malacological Fauna From The Cape Verde Archipelago. Part 1, Polyplacophora and Gastropoda.
 Torigoe K. & Inaba A. (2011) Revision on the classification of Recent Naticidae. Bulletin of the Nishinomiya Shell Museum 7: 133 + 15 pp., 4 pls.

External links
 Jeffreys, J. G. (1878-1885). On the Mollusca procured during the H. M. S. "Lightning" and "Porcupine" expedition. Proceedings of the Zoological Society of London. Part 1 (1878): 393-416, pls 22-23; Part 2 (1879): 553-588 pl. 45-46 [October 1879; Part 3 (1881): 693-724, pl. 61; Part 4 (1881): 922-952, pls 70-71 [1882]; Part 5 (1882): 656-687, pls 49-50 [1883]. Part 6 (1883): 88-115 pls 19-20; Part 7 (1884): 111-149, pls 9-10; Part 8 (1884): 341-372, pls 26-28; Part 9 (1885): 27-63 pls 4-6]
 Locard A. (1897-1898). Expéditions scientifiques du Travailleur et du Talisman pendant les années 1880, 1881, 1882 et 1883. Mollusques testacés. Paris, Masson. vol. 1 [1897, p. 1-516 pl. 1-22; vol. 2 [1898], p. 1-515, pl. 1-18.]

Naticidae
Gastropods described in 1885
Molluscs of the Atlantic Ocean
Gastropods of Cape Verde